Priluk is a rural locality (a village) in Vinogradovsky District, Arkhangelsk Oblast, Russia. The population was 17 as of 2010.

Geography 
Priluk is located 16 km east of Bereznik (the district's administrative centre) by road. Shilenga is the nearest rural locality.

References 

Rural localities in Vinogradovsky District